Junín Canton is a canton of Ecuador, located in the Manabí Province.  Its capital is the town of Junín.  Its population at the 2001 census was 18,496.

Demographics
Ethnic groups as of the Ecuadorian census of 2010:
Mestizo  71.8%
Montubio  19.4%
Afro-Ecuadorian  5.4%
White  3.4%
Indigenous  0.0%
Other  0.1%

References

Cantons of Manabí Province